Thomas Michael John Smith (born 29 August 1987) is an English cricketer who plays for Gloucestershire County Cricket Club.

Career

He is a right-handed batsman and a left-arm spinner, whose professional career started at Sussex in 2006, where he played eight List A matches, two Twenty20 matches and two first-class matches with modest success. However, further opportunities were limited due to the club possessing other spin options such as Mushtaq Ahmed, Ollie Rayner, Will Beer, Piyush Chawla, Saqlain Mushtaq, Rory Hamilton-Brown and Mike Yardy, and he was loaned to Surrey in 2009, where he made two Pro 40 appearances, helping them to a four-wicket win v Leicestershire by scoring 65 off 61 balls.

By the middle of the 2009 season, it had appeared likely Smith's future lay away from Sussex, and after Middlesex managing director of Cricket Angus Fraser watched him turn out for, he signed in October for the London-based club on a contract until 2012. In the same month, he was named in an England performance squad. In his first season, he was restricted to four County Championship appearances by Shaun Udal's presence, but featured extensively in the two limited-overs competitions, and won the Man of the Match award for taking 5–24 v Kent at Lord's. It was a similar story in 2011 – when the club signed his former team-mate Rayner on loan from Sussex in a deal which later become permanent and gave a short-term contract to Jamie Dalrymple – and 2012, as he played four Championship matches in that time but continued playing the majority of the limited-overs matches.

Smith signed a one-year contract with Middlesex for 2013, and things started brightly after he was included in the team for two Championship and three Yorkshire Bank 40 matches before the end of May. However, with Rayner making himself difficult to dislodge thanks to his batting and fielding ability and improving bowling performances, and Ravi Patel emerging, Smith was loaned to Gloucestershire in a deal that was ultimately extended until the end of the season. Highlights of his time there have included a YB40 hat-trick, and a maiden first-class 50. On 24 September 2013, as the 2013 season was finishing, Smith signed a three-year deal to take him up to the end of the 2016 season.

He continues to play for Gloucestershire into the 2019 season, predominantly in limited overs matches, though in July 2019 he made his highest first-class score of 84 against Leicestershire.

Career best performances
as of 11 August 2019

References

External links

1987 births
Living people
Sportspeople from Eastbourne
English cricketers
Middlesex cricketers
Surrey cricketers
Sussex cricketers
Gloucestershire cricketers